Nancys Rubias (Blonde Nancys) is a Spanish rock-band created in 2004 in Madrid. The group has released 5 albums.

Members

Current members
 Marta Vaquerizo "Nancy O" - Triangle
 Miguel "Nancy Reagan" - Keyboards and backing vocals
 Juan Pedro "Transvestite Nancy" (2004–present) - electric Guitar
 Mario Vaquerizo "Anorexic Nancy" (2004–present) - vocals

Past members
 Susie Pop "Legit Blonde Nancy" (2004–2008) - Guitar and vocals (died in 2008)

Discography

Albums
 "Nancys Rubias" (2005)
 "Gabba Gabba Nancys" (2007)
 "Una Cita Con Nancys Rubias" (2009)
 "Ahora o Nunca" (2011)
 "Amigas" (EP, 2014)

Singles
 "Maquillate" (2005)
 "Sálvame" (2005)
 "No Estás Curada" (2006)
 "Televisión" (2011)
 "Peluquitas" (2011)
 "Me Encanta" ("I Love It" cover) (2013)
 "Amigas" (2014)

Music videos
 "Nancys Rubias" (2005)
 "Maquillate" (2005)
 "Sálvame" (2005)
 "No Estas Curada" (2006)
 "Corazon de Hielo" (2007)
 "Di que sí" (2008)
 "Abre tu mente" (feat. Merche 2009)
 "GLAMAZONIA" (2009)
 "Televisión" (2010)
 "Peluquitas" (2011)
 "El mejor regalo eres tú" ("All I Want for Christmas Is You" cover) (2012)
 "Me Encanta" ("I Love It" cover) (2013)
 "Amigas" (2014)

References

External links

 The page of Susie Pop on Myspace
 Nancys Rubias' promotional text

Spanish rock music groups